The flag of Pennsylvania consists of a blue field on which the state coat of arms is displayed.

Design 
The flag of Pennsylvania is a blue field (by law, the same blue as the flag of the United States) charged with the state coat of arms.

Similarity to Other U.S. State Flags 

It is one of eight U.S. state flags to feature an eagle (alongside those of Illinois, Iowa, Michigan, New York, North Dakota, Oregon, and Utah). It is one of 19 U.S. state flags to feature a state seal or coat of arms charged on a field of blue (alongside Connecticut, Delaware, Idaho, Kansas, Kentucky, Louisiana, Maine, Michigan, Minnesota, Montana, Nebraska, New Hampshire, New York, Oregon, South Dakota, Utah, Vermont, Virginia, and Wisconsin), and one of 26 to feature one primary charge on a predominantly blue field (the 19 previously referenced, plus the flags of Alaska, Indiana, Nevada, North Dakota, Oklahoma, South Carolina, and Wyoming).

History 

On April 9th, 1799, the Pennsylvania General Assembly authorized the use of the state coat of arms on flags for the state militia. These flags took various forms, most commonly featuring the coat of arms either replacing the field of stars in the union of the US flag, or being placed alone on a field of blue. The depiction of the coat of arms would also vary from flag to flag, as the colors in the escutcheon of the arms were changed in 1809, and the color of the horses was not standardized until 1875.

The legislature eventually chose to create a standardized flag for general use, featuring a now-standardized coat of arms alone on a plain field of blue mandated to be the "same color as the blue field in the flag of the United States". This new flag was enacted by law on June 13, 1907.

Criticism and attempts to change the flag 
The Pennsylvania flag has been criticized for the complexity of its design, and its inability to stand out from other similar state flags across the US. Several attempts have been made by the Pennsylvania legislature and the public to address these criticisms by changing or altering the flag.

2001 NAVA Survey 
In 2001, the North American Vexillological Association surveyed 100 of its members and 337 members of the general public on the designs of the 72 U.S. state, U.S. territorial and Canadian provincial flags. The survey ranked Pennsylvania's flag 57th out of the 72, with a score of 3.69 on a scale of 0 to 10. Its low ranking was attributed to both the complexity of the coat of arms on its design, and its inability to stand out among a sea of similar “seal on a bedsheet” designs common to more than half of U.S. state flags flags.

Attempts to add "Pennsylvania" to the flag (2004-2014) 
Between 2004 and 2014, several attempts were made to add the word "Pennsylvania" to the state flag. According to former State Representative Tim Solobay (who introduced the first set of bills), this was intended to make Pennsylvania's flag more unique and identifiable.

While the bill failed to leave committee in the first two sessions it was introduced, a 2006 survey offered by Solobay's office to help refine the defined design may have swayed legislators to act on the bill, which was amended on May 7th, 2007. On June 11th, 2007, The Pennsylvania House of Representatives voted in favor of the bill, 164–31. The Senate State Government Committee never considered the bill, which died at the end of the Pennsylvania General Assembly's two-year session.

The bill was reintroduced by Solobay in 2009, and on the next session day, a second similar bill was introduced by former State Representative Gary Haluska with a competing definition of the design. Neither bill was raised in committee that session. Haluska's proposal was reintroduced alone in both the 2011-12 and 2013-14 sessions, and died in committee both times.

The Keystone Flag 

Following prolific changes to the Flag of Utah and the Flag of Mississippi, in 2017 the "Keystone Flag" was designed by Tara Stark, a Pennsylvania resident. The flag incorporates the keystone, a symbol already used in official capacities by the Pennsylvania National Guard and departments within the Government of Pennsylvania into a tricolor design using the colors on the coat of arms of Pennsylvania. The flag gained popularity in online vexillological circles, winning multiple online contests. Stark launched a Kickstarter campaign in 2022 to print the flag, raising more than $4,500. As of March 2023, it is beginning to see more popular use, notably including on a lapel pin worn by one state legislator.

Flags associated with Pennsylvania

See also
Flags of the U.S. states and territories
List of Pennsylvania state symbols

References

External links 
 Display of the state flag

Symbols of Pennsylvania
Flags of Pennsylvania
Pennsylvania
Pennsylvania